Nahr-e Owj may refer to:
 Nahr-e Owj Albu Seyyed
 Nahr-e Owj Albuhieh